Mount Calvary Cemetery in the West Hills of Portland, Oregon, United States, is a private cemetery owned and maintained by the Roman Catholic Archdiocese of Portland in Oregon. It is the second-oldest Catholic cemetery in Multnomah County, and was the third cemetery built in the West Hills.

History
In 1858, the Portland Archdiocese established its first cemetery, St. Mary's Cemetery, in Southeast Portland adjacent to Lone Fir Cemetery. By the late 1800s, that site was becoming full and a new site was needed. In 1888, the Archdiocese purchased  in the West Hills and established Mount Calvary Cemetery.

In 1930, St. Mary's was closed and the interments were relocated, mostly to Mount Calvary, and Central Catholic High School was built on the site of the old cemetery. In 1961, the Archdiocese opened a second cemetery in the Portland area, Gethsemani Catholic Cemetery, located in Happy Valley.

Facilities
 From its location in the West Hills, Mount Calvary has views of Portland and the surrounding mountains in the Cascade Range, as well as the Columbia River. In addition to more than 20,000 graves, the site contains a mausoleum, columbarium, and a hilltop altar for the celebration of Mass.

Notable burials
The cemetery is the final resting place for several archbishops of Portland as well as politicians, businessmen, actors, and sports figures.
 James M. Burns (1924–2001), federal judge
 Nonpareil Dempsey (1862–1895), boxing champion
 Christopher Evans (1847–1917), outlaw
 John M. Gearin (1851–1930), U.S. Representative from Oregon
 Ben Holladay (1819–1887), 19th century transportation businessman known as the "Stagecoach King"
 Edward Howard (1877–1983) archbishop of Portland and centenarian
 Larry Keating (1896–1963), actor
 Frank Leahy (1908–1973), college football coach at Notre Dame
 Richard Hedlund (1928–2019), “Portland’s mortician”
 Hall S. Lusk (1883–1983), Chief Justice of the Oregon Supreme Court and U.S. Senator from Oregon
 Cornelius Michael Power (1913–1997) archbishop of Portland
 George Shaw (1933–1998), American football player

See also
 Oregon Irish Famine Memorial

References

External links
 

Cemeteries in Portland, Oregon
Roman Catholic cemeteries in the United States
1888 establishments in Oregon
Northwest Portland, Oregon
Southwest Portland, Oregon